is a passenger railway station located in the city of Kasukabe, Saitama, Japan, operated by the private railway operator Tōbu Railway.

Lines

Station layout

The station has one island platform serving five tracks, with the platform connected to the station building by a footbridge. Track 1 is for non-stop trains, Tracks 2 and 5 are on passing loops, with tracks 3 and 4 served by the platform.

Platforms

Adjacent stations

History
Kita-Kasukabe Station opened on 1 September 1966.

From 17 March 2012, station numbering was introduced on all Tōbu lines, with Kita-Kasukabe Station becoming "TS-28".

Passenger statistics
In fiscal 2019, the station was used by an average of 10,406 passengers daily.

Surrounding area
 Kyoei University

See also
 List of railway stations in Japan

References

External links

  

Railway stations in Japan opened in 1966
Tobu Skytree Line
Stations of Tobu Railway
Railway stations in Saitama Prefecture
Kasukabe, Saitama